Cuttle is a two player card game played with a standard deck of 52 playing cards and is the earliest example of a combat card game. The game's earliest confirmed appearance took place in the 1970s, though the exact date of its creation is unknown.

Objective 
The objective of cuttle is to have 21 or more points in-play under one's control at any time. Points are acquired by playing any card which is not a face card to obtain the number of points represented by that card (with aces being worth one point, twos being worth two points, etc.) In order to reach 21 points before their opponent each player must attempt to use their turn most effectively.

Mechanics 
These are the standard mechanics as proposed in the earliest surviving ruleset. Several variations on these mechanics exist.

Playing a Card for Points 
When playing a card for points the player removes the card from their hand and places in front of them. Once a point card has been placed on the table it is considered in-play. Point cards which are in-play should be made distinctly separate from each player's layout and be visible to their opponent. Point cards which are removed from play in any way are placed in the universal discard pile.

Playing a Card as a One-off 
When playing a card as a one-off the player removes the card from their hand, alerts their opponent to the one-off ability of the card, and places it immediately into the universal discard pile. If there are no mitigating factors the effect of the card is then evaluated.
The following table enumerates each of the cards which may be played as one-offs and their abilities:

Adding a Card to the Layout
Each player maintains their own layout. These are cards which grant the controlling player a permanent gameplay effect until they are removed from play by another card.
The following table enumerates each of the cards which may be added to the player's layout and their effects:

Exceptions
Several of the cards in cuttle behave differently from standard one-offs or layout cards. They operate as follows:

Scuttling 
Scuttling is the act of using a card with a higher point value to force an opponent to discard one of their in-play point cards with a lower value than the card being used to scuttle. The card being used to scuttle is also discarded. In the event that two cards have the same point value the ability to scuttle another card is determined alphabetically by the name of the suit: Clubs - Diamonds - Hearts - Spades. If two cards have the same point value any card from a suit which before it in alphabetical order may be used to scuttle it.

Gameplay 
A game of Cuttle begins with a deal and then consists of the two players taking alternating turns.

Dealing 
At the beginning of the game a dealer is chosen randomly. The dealer deals five cards to their opponent and six to themself. These cards form the initial hands of both players. The remaining cards are placed face down between the players and become the draw pile.

Turns 
Turns alternate between each of the players beginning with the player who did not deal. On their turn a player may choose to do one of the following:
 Draw a card from the draw pile and place it in their hand
 Place a numerical card from their hand onto the table in order to obtain the corresponding number of points
 Place a card which may be used as a one-off into the discard in order to utilize its ability
 Place a card which may be used as a layout card in front of them to begin benefitting from its effect
 Place a card which can scuttle one of the opponents point cards on top of it and then move both cards into the discard pile
After performing their desired action the players turn is over and their opponent's turn begins.

Winning 
As soon as one player's score reaches 21 or more the game is over, with the player who has matched or exceeded 21 points being declared the winner. This can happen on either player's turn.

References

Play Cuttle Online at https://www.cuttle.cards
French deck card games